The 1955 All-SEC football team consists of American football players selected to the All-Southeastern Conference (SEC) chosen by various selectors for the 1955 college football season. Ole Miss won the conference.

All-SEC selections

Ends
Howard Schnellenberger, Kentucky (AP-1, UP-1)
Joe Tuminello, LSU (AP-1, UP-1)
Jimmy Phillips, Auburn (AP-2, UP-2)
Nick Germanus, Alabama (AP-3, UP-2)
Joe Stephenson, Vanderbilt (AP-2, UP-3)
Roy Wilkins, Georgia (AP-3, UP-3)

Tackles
Frank D'Agostino, Auburn (AP-1, UP-1)
Earl Leggett, LSU (AP-1, UP-1)
M. L. Bracket, Auburn (AP-2, UP-2)
Charley Rader, Tennessee (AP-2, UP-2)
Carl Vereen, Georgia Tech (UP-3)
Jim Barron, Miss. St. (AP-3, UP-3)

Guards
Scott Suber, Miss. St. (AP-1, UP-1)
Franklin Brooks, Georgia Tech (AP-1, UP-1)
Tony Sardisco, Tulane (AP-2, UP-2)
Vaughn Allison, Ole Miss (AP-2, UP-3)
Larry Frank, Vanderbilt (AP-3, UP-2)
Bryan Burnthorne, Tulane (AP-3, UP-3)

Centers
Steve DeLaTorre, Florida (AP-1, UP-1)
Jimmy Morris, Georgia Tech (UP-2)
Gene Dubuisson, Ole Miss (AP-2, UP-3)
Bob Scarbrough, Auburn (AP-3)

Quarterbacks
Eagle Day, Ole Miss (AP-3, UP-1)
Bob Hardy, Kentucky (AP-2, UP-2)
Wade Mitchell, Georgia Tech (UP-3)

Halfbacks 
 Johnny Majors, Tennessee (College Football Hall of Fame) (AP-1, UP-1)
 Fob James, Auburn (AP-1, UP-1)
Charley Horton, Vanderbilt (AP-1, UP-2)
 Art Davis, Miss. St. (AP-2, UP-2)
George Volkert, Georgia Tech (AP-2, UP-3)
Jackie Simpson, Florida (AP-3, UP-3)
Billy Kinard, Ole Miss (AP-3)

Fullbacks
Paige Cothren, Ole Miss (AP-1, UP-3)
Joe Childress, Auburn (AP-2, UP-1)
Ronnie Quilan, Tulane (AP-3, UP-2)

Key

AP = Associated Press.

UP = United Press.

Bold = Consensus first-team selection by both AP and UP

See also
1955 College Football All-America Team

References

All-SEC
All-SEC football teams